Baron Franz von der Trenck (German: Franz Freiherr von der Trenck, Croatian: Barun Franjo Trenk) (Reggio di Calabria. January 1, 1711 – Brno. October 4, 1749) was an Austrian soldier.

Early life 
Trenck was born into a military noble family which originated from Pomerania on 1 January 1711, in Reggio in south Italy, where his father Johann Heinrich von der Trenck served as an Austrian officer. Although born in Italy, Trenk was actually a Prussian with Austrian citizenship, and with large estates in Croatia, more precisely Slavonia. He spent his childhood mostly in Italy, Slavonia and Hungary, which was not unusual since his father's job required frequent relocation. He was educated by the Jesuits at Ödenburg.

Military career 
Trenck entered the Imperial army in 1728 but resigned in disgrace three years later and decided to live peacefully in Požega, Slavonia. He married and lived on his estate for a few years. Upon the death of his wife who had perished in the black plague of 1737, he offered to raise an irregular corps of pandurs for service against the Turks, but this offer was refused, after which he entered the Imperial Russian Army as a mercenary. In Russia he met and befriended Ernst Gideon von Laudon. But after serving against the Turks and Tatars during the Russo-Turkish War for a short time as captain and major of cavalry he was accused of bad conduct, brutality and disobedience and condemned to death. Despite showing insubordination he had gained popularity for defying an order to retreat.  His sentence was commuted by Field Marschal Münnich to degradation and imprisonment.

After a time Trenck returned to Austria, where his father was governor of a small fortress, but there he came into conflict with everyone and actually took sanctuary in a convent in Vienna. Prince Charles Alexander of Lorraine, interesting himself in this strange man, obtained for him an amnesty and a commission in a corps of irregulars. In this command, besides his usual truculence and bad manners, he displayed conspicuous personal bravery, and in spite of the general dislike into which his vices brought him his services were so valuable that he was promoted to lieutenant-colonel (1743) and colonel (1744).

Trenck earned most of his fame during the War of the Austrian Succession, as the leader and commander of a unit of pandurs, or paramilitary troops in the Austrian army which specialized in frontier warfare, guerrilla tactics and surprise hit-and-run actions, into which he recruited mostly Croatian mercenaries, experienced fighters from the Austro-Ottoman Military Frontier. The Trenck's Pandurs soon became infamous for the atrocities they committed on the civilian population, some actions deemed brutal even by the standards of the day.

When the War of the Austrian Succession broke out Trenck rallied volunteers and marched for Vienna to assist Maria Theresa of Austria. While in Vienna, Trenck's Pandurs marched the streets before invading Prussia. At the Battle of Soor he and his irregulars plundered when they should have been fighting and Trenck was accused of having allowed King Frederick the Great himself to escape.

Imprisonment and death 
After a time he was brought before a court-martial in Vienna, which convicted him of having sold and withdrawn commissions to his officers without the permission of the empress, having punished his men without heed of the military code, and having drawn pay and allowance for fictitious men. Much was allowed to an irregular officer in all these respects, but Trenck had far outrun the admitted limits, and above all his brutalities and robberies had made him detested throughout Austria and Silesia. A death sentence followed, but the composition of the court-martial and its proceedings were thought to have been such as from the first forbade a fair trial as such, though most modern historians think the sentence to have been correct, even so. Nonetheless, concerns about the apparently arbitrary form of the proceedings meant that eventually the sentence was commuted by the Empress into one of cashiering and imprisonment. The rest of his life was spent in mild captivity in the fortress of Spielberg in Brno, where he died on October 4, 1749.  
In his last will he left the sum of 30,000 florins to the small town of Marienburg which had been sacked, burned and razed to the ground by his troops.

Trenck's mummified remains can presently be seen on display in the crypt of Brno's Capuchin Monastery.

Notes

Although Baron Trenck wasn't an ethnic Croat, even now there is phrase in Germany: "Wir sind Kroaten, wir sind panduren", ("We are Croats; we are Pandours"), because many of his Pandurs were Croatians.
 Franz is the first cousin of Friedrich Freiherr von der Trenck who was serving in the Prussian army. During the wars in Silesia they were on different sides and Friedrich was imprisoned out of alleged conspiracy with Franz.
 Mark Twain included Baron Trenck in an ironic list of Tom Sawyer's "heroes" in Adventures of Huckleberry Finn.
His story was the basis for the 1911 operetta Baron Trenck by Felix Albini, Alfred Maria Willner and Robert Bodanzky

References

Attribution:

Barons of Austria
Austrian soldiers
Croatian soldiers
1711 births
1749 deaths
Austrian military personnel of the War of the Austrian Succession
18th-century Italian people
18th-century Austrian people
Italian people of Austrian descent